Robert Jason may refer to:

Robert Jason, see TRANSform Me
Robert Jason of the Jason Baronets